Álvaro Molina is a Grand Prix motorcycle racer from Spain.

Career statistics

By season

Races by year
(key) (Races in bold indicate pole position, races in italics indicate fastest lap)

References

External links
 Profile on motogp.com

1976 births
Spanish motorcycle racers
125cc World Championship riders
250cc World Championship riders
Living people